The bight redfish (Centroberyx gerrardi) is a member of the order Beryciformes. It can reach sizes of up to  TL.

References

External links
  Fishes of Australia : Centroberyx gerrardi

bight redfish
Fish of the Indian Ocean
Fish of the Pacific Ocean
Marine fish of Southern Australia
bight redfish
bight redfish